Thomas Lewis Lyons (born August 7, 1948) is a former American football offensive lineman for the University of Georgia and the Denver Broncos  of the National Football League (NFL).

Football career
He graduated Georgia Military Academy (now Woodward) and then from the University of Georgia in 1971.  He earned both his bachelor's and master's degrees in clinical bio-psychology from the University of Georgia. He was selected 14th round of the 1971 NFL Draft.  Lyons played for the Broncos for six seasons, starting in 43 consecutive games at one point during his career.

Medical career
After his time in the NFL, Lyons went to University of Colorado Medical School, graduating with a medical degree in 1977.  He practices medicine in Atlanta. He is the Director of the Center for Women's Care and Reproductive Surgery in Atlanta. He is director of Gynecologic surgery, Chief of Surgery of Advanced Surgery Center of Atlanta. He is also a Clinical Assistant Professor at the department of OB/GYN at Emory University School of Medicine. He has written over 19 chapters for medical publications and has written 30 publications.

Awards
Lyons received a Silver Anniversary Award from the National Collegiate Athletic Association in 1996.

In 2002, he was the recipient of the Bill Hartman Award recognizing his excellence in his profession and/or service to others.

Dr. Lyons was one of 16 graduates from the University of Georgia Graduate School who received the 2013 Alumni of Distinction Award. The award is given to recognize alumni who achieve exceptional success in their professional careers and in service to their community.

References

External links
 Database Football

1948 births
Living people
American football centers
American football offensive guards
Denver Broncos players
Georgia Bulldogs football players
American gynecologists
University of Colorado School of Medicine alumni
Players of American football from Atlanta
Physicians from Georgia (U.S. state)
Woodward Academy alumni